The Goose Air Defense Sector (GADS) is an inactive United States Air Force organization.  Its last assignment was with the 26th Air Division,  being stationed at Goose Air Force Base, Labrador, Canada.  It was inactivated on 1 April 1966 and replaced by the 37th Air Division.

History
Command and control echelon of command, controlling both radar and fighter squadrons in Canada.  Provided air defense of northeast North America.  Assigned units of the 4732d Air Defense Group at Goose AFB in April 1960 and the 4731st Air Defense Group at Ernest Harmon AFB in June.  Both groups were discontinued. These units included two Fighter-Interceptor Squadrons (FIS), although the 323rd FIS was discontinued almost immediately after transfer.  Both squadrons flew F-102 "Delta Daggers," although the 59th FIS had not completed its conversion from F-89 "Scorpions" when it was first assigned  Also operated Semi Automatic Ground Environment (SAGE) Direction Center (DC-31) (Manual) at CFB North Bay, Ontario   Inactivated in 1966 and personnel and equipment transferred to 37th Air Division.

Lineage
 Constituted as Goose Air Defense Sector on 7 March 1960
 Activated on 1 April 1960
 Inactivated on 1 April 1966.

Assignments
 64th Air Division, 1 April 1950 - 1 July 1963
 26th Air Division, 1 July 1963 - 1 April 1966

Components

Air Force
 Air Forces Iceland
 Keflavik Airport, 4 September 1963 - 1 April 1966

Wing
 4683d Air Defense Wing
 Thule AB, Greenland, 1 July 1963 - 1 July 1965

Groups
 4683d Air Base Group 1 July 1965 - 1 April 1966
 Thule AB, Greenland, 1 October 1960
 4684th Air Base Group
 Sondrestrom AB, Greenland, 4 September 1963 - 1 April 1966

Squadrons
 59th Fighter-Interceptor Squadron 6 Jun 1960 -
 Goose Bay AFB, Labrador, 1 April 1956 - 1 April 1966
 323d Fighter-Interceptor Squadron
 Ernest Harmon AFB, Newfoundland, 6 June 1960 - 1 July 1960

 640th Aircraft Control and Warning Squadron
 Stephenville Air Station, Newfoundland, 1 June 1960 - 1 April 1966
 641st Aircraft Control and Warning Squadron
 Melville AS, Labrador, 1 April 1960 - 1 April 1966
 642d Aircraft Control and Warning Squadron
 Red Cliff AS, Newfoundland, 1 June 1960 - 1 October 1961
 920th Aircraft Control and Warning Squadron
 Resolution Island AS, Northern Territories, 1 April 1960 - 1 October 1961
 921st Aircraft Control and Warning Squadron
 Saint Anthony AS, Newfoundland, 1 April 1960 - 1 April 1966

 922d Aircraft Control and Warning Squadron
 Cartwright AS, Labrador, 1 April 1960 - 1 April 1966
 923d Aircraft Control and Warning Squadron
 Hopedale AS, Labrador, 1 April 1960 - 1 April 1966
 924th Aircraft Control and Warning Squadron
 Saglek AS, Labrador, 1 April 1960 - 1 April 1966
 926th Aircraft Control and Warning Squadron
 Frobisher Bay Air Base, Northwest Territories, 1 April 1960 - 1 November 1961

Stations
 Goose Bay AFB, Labrador, Canada, 1 April 1960 - 1 April 1966

Aircraft
 F-89J 1960
 F-102A 1960-1966

References

 
 
 
 Radomes.org Goose Air Defense Sector

Goose Bay
1963 establishments in Canada
1966 disestablishments in Canada
Military units and formations disestablished in 1966